Peter Jánský (born May 3, 1985) is a Czech professional ice hockey player. He has played with HC Litvínov in the Czech Extraliga for seven seasons, from the 2004–05 Czech Extraliga season till the 2010–11 Czech Extraliga season. In 2011 he moved to another Czech Extraliga team, HC Sparta Praha.

Jánský has also played for the Czech Republic men's national ice hockey team. He has played for them in the Euro Hockey Tour.

References

External links

1985 births
Czech ice hockey forwards
HC Litvínov players
HC Sparta Praha players
Living people
Sportspeople from Most (city)
HC Stadion Litoměřice players
Rytíři Kladno players
HC Most players